The Stairfoot rail accident was a railway accident that took place at Stairfoot, West Riding of Yorkshire, England.

Details of accident
On 12 December 1870, in Barnsley top yard a rake of 10 goods wagons was standing on a gradient of 1 in 119. A single sprag between the spokes of a wheel was holding them. When two gas tank wagons were shunted against the rake, the sprag broke and the 12 wagons began to move. Two pointsmen made valiant efforts to pin down the brakes to no avail. The wagons rapidly gathered speed as the gradient increased to 1 in 72 and passed three signal boxes, none of which had points under their control to deflect the runaways. Meanwhile, a passenger train which had left Barnsley at 18:15 was standing at Stairfoot station one and a half miles away. The runaways struck the rear of the standing train at a speed of at least 40 mph, killing 15 and injuring 59 more.

The enquiry by Lieut-Col F. H. Rich found that the goods guard was gravely at fault for not ensuring the standing wagons were better secured. The layout of the yard was also criticized as there were no trap points to protect the running lines in the event of such a mishap.

Similar accidents
Abergele rail disaster (1868)

References

Sources

External links
Full report of Enquiry into Accident at Stairfoot on 12 December 1870

History of Barnsley
Railway accidents and incidents in Yorkshire
Railway accidents in 1870
Runaway train disasters
1870 in England
Rail transport in South Yorkshire
History of South Yorkshire
19th century in Yorkshire
Accidents and incidents involving Manchester, Sheffield and Lincolnshire Railway
December 1870 events
Train collisions in England
1870 disasters in the United Kingdom